Mano Ya Na Mano is a horror television drama-series aired on Zee TV channel in 1995. The series was directed by Rajesh Ranashinge.

Concept
The series features episodic horror/thriller stories based on supernatural beliefs. Each story is portrayed in a fabricated and dramatic representation based on mystic and paranormal convictions. Besides, each story is shot in a different location and consists of a different star cast.

Episodes

Episode Title - Kabzaa

Cast: Durga Jasraj, Shefali Shah, Ashwin Kaushal, Suhag Diwan, Hema Diwan, Faiyaz Shaikh, Monica Godbole, Kishore Bhatt, Prem Raaj, Sharad Sharma, Deepali & Yogita

Director: Homi Wadia

Episode Title - Rima

Cast: Rima, Homi Wadia, Ankita Nigam, Prashant Bhatt, Vinit Kumar, Mangala Kenkre, Bhairavi Raichura, Paresh Panchmatia, Kukul Tarmaster, Apoorva Acharya & Rohini Hattangady

Director: Homi Wadia

Episode Title - Parcchaai 

Cast: Tinu Anand, Sudhanshu Pandey, Asha Sharma, Ragini, Achala Sachdev, Kishori Kulkarni & Eva Grover

Director: Pavan S. Kaul

Episode Title - Anumaan

Cast: Shivaji Satam, Sangeeta Handa, Kiran Karmarkar, Anirudh Agarwal

Episode Title - Vash

Cast: Alyy Khan, Resham Tipnis, Imtiaz Khan, Sunil Rege

Episode Title - Sauten

Episode Title - Darr

See also
 List of Hindi horror shows

References

External links
 

Balaji Telefilms television series
Zee TV original programming
Indian horror fiction television series
1995 Indian television series debuts
1995 Indian television series endings